Gudrun Veronika Kugler, née Lang, also known as Kugler-Lang (born 12 November 1976, Gmunden, Upper Austria), is a Roman Catholic theologian, jurist, and ÖVP-member of Austria's National Council.

Kugler is known for her involvement in the anti-abortion movements and her work on combatting of human trafficking, the abolition of the death penalty, on preserving marriage as the union between men and women, and on combating social discrimination and persecution of Christians and other faith groups in Europe and worldwide.

Political and business activities
Kugler holds master's degrees in law and women's studies, and a doctorate in International Law. In 1999, she earned her Master’s of Theological Studies on Marriage and the Family.

From 2001 to 2004, she worked in Brussels as the first director of the World Youth Alliance-Europe, representing 1.5 million young people from 100 countries at the EU and UN.

In January 2005, she and her husband founded Kairos-PR, a consulting company based in Vienna which focuses on charitable initiatives.

In 2005, Kugler ran as an independent candidate for the Austrian People's Party at the Vienna municipal elections and earned the most votes after the top candidate Johannes Hahn (currently Austria's EU Commissioner). In this context, abortion rights advocates and anti-abortion activists accused each other of fundamentalism.

In April 2010, Kugler was elected a member of the Advisory Panel of the Fundamental Rights Platform (a form of co-operation of EU Fundamental Rights Agency with NGOs), for a period of two years.

In 2015, she was elected to the Viennese municipal council for the ÖVP, due to 1.652 preference votes received.

In October 2017, she stunned political observers when, in the legislative elections, her electoral district Vienna North, a traditional social-democratic stronghold, returned the highest increase in votes, with more than +9%. As the top candidate for this district, Kugler won a direct seat in the National Council. She also received the second-most preference votes of all regional ÖVP-candidates in Vienna.

Activities in the Austrian Parliament and the OSCE 

Since 2017, Gudrun Kugler is a Member of the Austrian Parliament. Re-elected in 2019, she is now the human rights spokesperson, as well as the spokesperson for WWII-exiled minorities, for the parliamentary group of ÖVP. She is Vice-chair of the human rights committee, the equality committee, and the committee for ombudsperson. Furthermore, she is member of the Austrian Delegation to the Parliamentary Assembly of the OSCE, Vice-chair of the OSCE PA Ad Hoc Committee on Migration, and chair of the Austrian bi-lateral parliamentary group with Armenia, Azerbaijan, and Georgia.

As spokesperson for human rights, Gudrun Kugler initiated numerous parliamentary resolutions, e. g., on the protections of religious minorities such as Christian minorities, the Muslim minority of Uighurs in China, the Bahaí in Yemen, on the combat of human trafficking and organ trafficking, on the protection of vulnerable groups in asylum procedures, on the protection against female genital mutilation (FGM), on human rights compliant prison conditions, the protection of human rights standards in artificial intelligence, or the protection of the rights of people with disabilities.

Kugler is also known for her critique on the human rights conditions in China, and for her ambitions to strengthen the collaboration between Central- and Eastern European states.

Positions

Christian activities 
Together with other Christian intellectuals, Kugler founded Europe for Christ!, an initiative to encourage Christians to be aware of their responsibilities in the political forum. She also established the Observatory on Intolerance and Discrimination against Christians in Europe.

Kugler attended the first meeting of the OSCE Office for Democratic Institutions and Human Rights on "intolerance and discrimination against Christians" as a representative of the Documentation Centre.

Kugler has stated that "intolerance against Christians by negative stereotyping and discrimination by denial of rights are on the rise". Since 2008, Kugler has taught as an adjunct professor at the International Theological Institute in Vienna, Austria. She founded and ran the youth academy of the Dr.-Karl-Kummer-Institute. In 2010, she and Denis Borel edited the book "Entdeckung der Freundschaft" (German: the discovery of friendship) in honor of the 65th Birthday of Cardinal Christoph Schönborn. Together with her husband, Kugler founded the Catholic marriage bureau "kathTreff".

In 2019, Kugler held a speech at the event of "Awakening Austria" in which she deplored that marriage had become "something arbitrary" (German: "etwas Beliebiges"). The event was held during the election campaign of ÖVP-chancellor Sebastian Kurz, and received public attention as Ben Fitzgerald (founder of "Awakening Europe") called the thousands of attendants to pray for Sebastian Kurz.

Socio-political stance 
Kugler wants registrars in Vienna to be able to refuse the establishment of registered partnerships with reference to their Christian faith. She is a supporter of the American officer Kim Davis, who refused to issue marriage certificates to homosexual couples due to her Christian faith. Davis temporarily had to go to jail for this. For Kugler, Davis is a prime example of modern-day Christian persecution. Kugler further argues that the authentication of same-sex marriage would consequently lead to marriage among siblings.

Awards
Kugler received the Leopold Kunschak Prize for her dissertation, and the prize of the foundation "Ja zum Leben" (German: "'yes' to life") for her work in Brussels.

In 2018, Kugler received the "Thomas More Award" by the International Catholic Legislators Network.

Private life 
Gudrun Kugler is married to Martin Kugler, historian, head of Kairos Consulting, and former spokesperson of the Austrian branch of the conservative Catholic association Opus Dei, which he, however, left before they marriedage, and has four children.

Publications

Monographs

Essays and Articles 
 Gudrun Kugler-Lang: Gastkommentar : Das "F-Wort" mit dem langen Bart in Wiener Zeitung vom 14. Februar 2006 auch online
 Gudrun Kugler: There is no right to abortion, Europe for Christ: Letter for Europe 48 (February 2010)
 Gudrun Kugler: Intervening at a political debate, Europe for Christ: Letter for Europe 38 (March 2009)
 Gudrun Kugler: Successful Christian Arguing, Europe for Christ: Letter for Europe 29 (May 2008)

References

External links
 Observatory on Intolerance and Discrimination against Christians
 Website of Gudrun Kugler's Consulting Agency "Kairos-PR"

21st-century Austrian Roman Catholic theologians
1976 births
Austrian jurists
Austrian anti-abortion activists
Living people
People from Gmunden